Dr. Atif Abdelmageed Abdelrahman Ahmed from Khartoum, Sudan (born June 7) serves as Executive Director of the Arab Regional Scout Office of the World Scout Bureau. In 2006, he was named Director of the Arab Region.

He was previously in charge of the Sudanese Air Scout program, and is a gliding pilot. He studied Medicine at the University of Juba and Pennsylvania State University, worked for the World Health Organization, lived in Omdurman, and lives in Nasr City, a district of Cairo, Egypt.

References

External links

WSEC Day 2 - Keynote Address Academia - Dato Thomas Chee and Atif Abdelmageed, YouTube
Dr. Atif Abdelmageed Abdelrahman, issuu
2011 ARTDO 38th Conference Speakers List, The Chinese Society for Training and Development
Biography of Dr. Atif Abdelmageed Abdelrahman, issuu
Happy Birthday, scout.org

Scouting and Guiding in Sudan
Living people
Year of birth missing (living people)
People from Khartoum
Penn State College of Medicine alumni
University of Juba alumni